Acheilognathus tabira jordani is a subspecies of Acheilognathus tabira.

Named in honor of David Starr Jordan (1851–1931), who contributed greatly to Japanese ichthyology, including original description of A. tabira.

References

Acheilognathus